The Cerchez is a right tributary of the river Ceair in Romania. It flows into the Ceair near Dumbrăveni.

References

Rivers of Romania
Rivers of Constanța County